Hettie Beaman Lakin Shumway (September 1, 1903 – June 17, 1985) was an American philanthropist and humanist during the early and mid-twentieth century. She committed much of her time to volunteering and worked to change and improve the Rochester, New York area, particularly at the Strong Memorial Hospital, the East House Corporation, Lifeline, the Rochester School for the Deaf, among various other councils and committees. Shumway was also a strong advocate for establishing the National Technical Institute for the Deaf on the campus of the Rochester Institute of Technology.

Personal life 
Hettie Beaman Lakin (September 1, 1903 – June 17, 1985) was born to Herbert Conrad Lakin (1872–1952) and Helen Wardner Beaman (1877–1967) on her maternal grandparent's country estate named Blow-Me-Down in Cornish, New Hampshire. The oldest of four children, she and her family lived in New York City then moved to Scarsdale, New York and eventually settled down in Greenwich, Connecticut.  Hettie was first educated at Brearley School in New York City and graduated from St. Timothy's School in Catonsville, Maryland. She also took courses at Barnard College and later would take American Red Cross courses in 1939.  Hettie spent summers either at Blow-Me-Down or the Beaman family's summer home on Isle au Haut in Maine. Throughout her life Hettie enjoyed swimming, ice skating, singing, listening to radio broadcasts of the Metropolitan Opera Company, and sailing. She also travelled Europe with her Aunt Mary Holmes and Uncle Ned Holmes. As a youth, Hettie sang with the Junior League Glee Club and the People's Chorus of New York City. She also joined the New York Junior League where she began volunteering in a settlement house and she later volunteered at the Child Welfare Department in Westchester County. On New Year's Day of 1930, Hettie Lakin met Frank Ritter Shumway when they both went to see Carmen at the opera. Nine months later on Monday, September 8, 1930 Hettie and Frank were married at Round Hill Community Church in Greenwich, Connecticut. Shortly after their wedding, the couple moved to 14 Crick Road, Oxford, England so Mr. Shumway could be educated at the University of Oxford. On May 30, 1931, Frank and Hettie Shumway welcomed their first child, Mary Ellen Shumway. The couple's second child, Frank Ritter Shumway Jr., would be born on May 9, 1933. In 1934 the Shumway family moved to the Rochester, New York area. They designed, built, and moved into a home on Ambassador Drive in Brighton, New York by the end of 1935. The third and final child of the family, Charles Lakin Shumway, was born on July 8, 1936. With a living room full of family photos, that home would become a gathering place for health and social agency staff, various committee members, traveling figure skaters, and many other friends. The Shumway family had a passion for sailing and owned two schooners named “Spindrift” and “Skookum III”. They also owned a beloved fifty-foot ketch named “Flying Gull”. Summers were spent sailing the Great Lakes and vacationing at Georgian Bay. Hettie Shumway was extremely fond of sailing and adored spending time with her husband on the "Flying Gull". Hettie dedicated much of her life to volunteerism, philanthropy, and humanism. She continued to be involved in the community even after she suffered from a paralyzing stroke in 1984, which left her in a wheelchair under the almost constant care of a nurse. Even a few days after her stroke, she left the hospital to attend a Friends of Strong event. Hettie Beaman Lakin Shumway died in her home on Ambassador Drive.

Philanthropy and community involvement

Strong Memorial Hospital 

Hettie Shumway began volunteering in Strong Memorial Hospital’s library in 1935 and continued to volunteer and be active with the medical center until her death in 1985. She served on various boards and committees and also helped to found the Friends of Strong. Shumway received the University of Rochester’s Associates Medal in 1968 for her 34 years of service. Mrs. Shumway was appointed to the Board of Overseers for the hospital in 1974. In 1984 she received Strong's first Hettie L. Shumway Volunteer Service Award.

East House Corporation 

Mrs. Shumway was a major advocate for people with mental health problems. She believed that patients leaving the Rochester Psychiatric Center needed a halfway house to continue their supervision as they adjusted to the outside community. Although Shumway faced a lot of resistance from the community, the East House Corporation was founded with her support and the first halfway house opened in 1966. At this time, she was the vice president of East House. She later became the president of East House Corp. in January 1968 and held that position until 1971. In 1981, East House Corp. named one of their houses after Mrs. Shumway.

Lifeline 
Hettie Shumway sustained interest in the Rochester area's Poison Control hotline and Mental Health Crisis phone service. With her financial support, these two groups were able to develop and progress. Hettie eventually brought the groups together to form Lifeline, a multi-crisis phone service for the Rochester community.

Politics 
Mrs. Shumway was a dedicated Republican who was known for waking up early on Election Day to vote. She became a charter member of the Susan B. Anthony Republican Club in 1949 and was on the board of directors from 1952 to 1964 and again from 1967 to 1969. Hettie was the president of the Susan B. Anthony Republican Club in 1955 and 1956. For many years Hettie would also host the Republican Club's annual garden party. Mrs. Shumway was a Republican committeewoman for the 8th District of Brighton from 1957 to 1966 and during this time she was the County Committeewoman from 1960 to 1966. Hettie was the Leader of District 8 from 1961 to 1966.

Generosity 
Hettie Shumway was known for giving money to those in need and funding various projects. She would often provide aid to extended family who were struggling to afford education, pay off a mortgage, or who needed to pay counseling fees. At one point, Hettie learned that her housekeeper was going to lose her home and so Hettie bought the house and gave it to her. Mrs. Shumway also paid for a hearing-loop to be installed in her secretary's church as a gift honoring the secretary's 25th wedding anniversary. Once Hettie bought a new roof for one of the halfway homes belonging to the East House Corporation so that the price of lunch for those in need wouldn't be raised $1 (Miller).

Mental health advocacy 
Hettie was very committed to the well-being of those with mental health problems, as seen in her role with East House Corporation. Within the Rochester Community she worked in several other areas involving mental health patients. Mrs. Shumway worked with esteemed psychiatrist, Dr. John Romano, of the University of Rochester to develop the Mental Health Chapter of the Health Association. When New York declared that the state would provide funds to counties who established mental health facilities, Hettie pushed for Monroe County to take the impressive opportunity, which was ultimately rejected. Once the Mental Health Chapter was established, Hettie became a member in 1949. She served as chairman of the board from 1955 to 1957 and again from 1958 to 1960. During 1957 and 1958 Hettie was a vice chairman of the board. Mrs. Shumway also served as a delegate director of the board of directors of the New York State Association for Mental Health, Inc. from 1956 to 1965. In the years 1958 and 1963 Hettie was chosen from the New York State Association to be a delegate for the National Association for Mental Health Annual Convention. Between 1964 and 1965 Mrs. Shumway served as the regional vice president of the State Association for Region V. In 1963 Hettie was also on the Ad Hoc Committee of the Mental Health Council on Psychiatric Services in General Hospitals.

Rochester School for the Deaf 
While Hettie was always an advocate for the education of deaf people, her intrigue grew even more when she learned later in life that she was deaf in one ear. Due to her interest, Mrs. Shumway worked with the Rochester School for the Deaf for many years. She became a member of the board of directors of the school in 1941 and remained a member for 44 years. Hettie was vice president of the school from January 1951 through January 1953 and was then the president of the Rochester School for the Deaf from January 1953 until January 1959. It was well known that Hettie truly cared for the students and was often seen walking with them or sitting on park benches with them. Hettie's involvement with the Rochester School for the Deaf enabled her to learn of the plans for the National Technical Institute for the Deaf early on. The Rochester School for the Deaf has honored Mrs. Shumway by naming the school's recreational area Shumway Court.

Rochester School of Technology / National Technical Institute for the Deaf 
Hettie Shumway was highly involved with the Rochester Institute of Technology and also with the institute's addition of the National Technical Institute for the Deaf. Hettie was on the Women's Council of the Rochester Institute of Technology and acted as president from 1959 to 1965. She was also a member of the board of trustees of RIT from 1959 to 1965. Mrs. Shumway was a strong advocate for the campus to be moved to Henrietta, which it eventually was. Hettie and her husband were major contributors to the 150th Campaign Fund on campus, as well as the Interfaith Center Fund. In 1965 Hettie was in Washington with a committee searching for a new superintendent for the Rochester School for the Deaf. It was here that Hettie learned how Public Law 89-36 was searching for a place to establish NTID. Upon her return to RIT, Mrs. Shumway approached Dr. Mark Ellingson, the president of RIT with a copy of the bill and told him, "there is no place in the United States that this ought to go except Rochester Institute of Technology,". Dr. Ellingson had Professor Harold Kentner speak with the National Advisory Group who were working to find a location for NTID and Kentner went on the write the formal proposal to the group requesting the NTID be established on the RIT campus in Henrietta. On October 1, 1966, the Department of Health, Education, and Welfare wrote to RIT to inform them that they had been selected as the future location of NTID. On December 20 of that year, an agreement was signed confirming the NTID site. In 1967 Hettie Shumway became a member of the advisory board for the establishment of the National Technical Institute for the Deaf. Today the dining commons at NTID are named in Hettie Shumway's honor.

Junior League of Rochester 
Mrs. Shumway was on the board of directors for the Junior League of Rochester from 1939 until 1944. Between 1940 and 1942 Hettie served as a placement chairman for the board. She became president of the Junior League for two years beginning in 1942.

Department of Volunteers of the Council of Social Agencies 
Hettie was a member of the board of directors from 1939 to 1950 and served as chairman from 1946 to 1948.

Civil Defense Volunteer Office of the Rochester War Council 
Hettie Shumway began taking American Red Cross courses in 1939 and became a chairman of the Civil Defense Volunteer Office of the Rochester War Council in May 1942. She held this position until the end World War II. Her responsibilities included working with rationing boards, civilian protection services, and war stamp and bond committees.

Young Women’s Christian Association 
Mrs. Shumway was a member of the board of directors from 1944 to 1947.

Monroe County Chapter of the Association for the Help of Retarded Children 
Hettie was a member of the board of directors from June 1957 until November 1959.

Heart Chapter/Genesee Valley Heart Association 
Mrs. Shumway served as a member of the board of directors of the Heart Chapter from 1964 through June 1968. The organization was later renamed the Genesee Valley Heart Association.

Monroe County Board of Health 
Hettie Shumway became a charter member of the Monroe County Board of Health in 1958. In September 1961 she was appointed a six-year term and was reappointed in 1967. Mrs. Shumway served as president to the Monroe County Board of Health from 1966 to 1970.

Health Association of Rochester and Monroe County 
Hettie Shumway became a member of the board of directors in 1937 and served as the association's president in 1962.

Project HOPE 
Mrs. Shumway was an honorary chairman of Project HOPE from 1966 to 1967. Then in 1967 she became a chairman of the board of directors of the Rochester Committee for Project HOPE until 1970.

New York State's Committee for Children 
Hettie Shumway was a member of New York State's Committee for Children in 1971.

Awards and honors 
In 1968 Hettie received University of Rochester’s Associates Medal for her service to the medical center for over 34 years.

In 1975 Hettie was the seventh recipient of the Forman Flair Pin.

In 1978 the Genesee Figure Skating Club redesigned their lounge and named the lounge the Hettie L. Shumway Lounge.

In 1981 the East House Corporation named one of their halfway houses located on Mt. Hope Avenue after Mrs. Shumway.

In 1983 the F. Ritter Shumway and Hettie L. Shumway Distinguished Service Award was created as a way to recognize those who have made a significant impact on the quality of family life in the Rochester community.

In 1984 Hettie received Strong Memorial Hospital’s first Hettie L. Shumway Volunteer Service Award.

Hettie received the Biggs Award.

Hettie received the Nathanial Rochester Society Award from RIT.

The National Technical Institute for the Deaf’s dining commons are named after Hettie Shumway.

Rochester School for the Deaf’s recreational area named Shumway Court in honor of Mrs. Shumway.

Quotes 
“Stay faithful to what is to your heart, it makes a difference." –Hettie Shumway

“I love people and I want to share the many blessings life has brought me. It takes so little effort to help people.” –Hettie Shumway

“Mark, there is no place in the United States that this ought to go except Rochester Institute of Technology. The long history of the Institute, its help in channeling men and women into the mainstream of American business is so strong, that we have and open and shut case.” –Hettie Shumway

Notes

References 
Bennett, Judy. "A Lounge for Figure Skaters." Democrat and Chronicle, March 26, 1978.
"Biography of Hettie L. Shumway." typescript., Rochester Institute of Technology, 1971.
Gordon, Dane. Rochester Institute of Technology: Industrial Development and Educational Innovation in an American City, 1829–2006. Rochester: Rochester Institute of Technology, 2007.
Mathews, Bill memorandum to JoAnne Lane. "Mrs. F. Ritter (Hettie) Shumway, Profile Revision." Office Memorandum, Rochester Institute of Technology, 1983.
Miller, Audrey, and Carol Reed. Commitment to Community: Celebrating the Heritage and Legacy of Frank Ritter Shumway & Hettie Beaman Lakin Shumway. Rochester: Rochester Institute of Technology, 1994.
“Miss Hettie Lakin Weds Next Monday." New York Times, September 4, 1930.
Orioli, Richard, and Carol Eisenberg. “Hettie L. Shumway Dies at 81: Community volunteer, humanitarian, friend of people in need." Times-Union, June 18, 1985.
“She Has a ‘Flair’” Democrat and Chronicle, September 17, 1975.

1903 births
1985 deaths
American humanitarians
Women humanitarians
Activists from Rochester, New York
Brearley School alumni